Jean Carlos Mina Aponzá is a Colombian paralympic athlete. He participated at the 2020 Summer Paralympics in the athletics competition, being awarded the bronze medal in the men's 100 metres event on T13 class, scoring 10.64.

References 

Living people
Place of birth missing (living people)
Year of birth missing (living people)
Colombian male sprinters
Athletes (track and field) at the 2020 Summer Paralympics
Medalists at the 2020 Summer Paralympics
Paralympic medalists in athletics (track and field)
Paralympic athletes of Colombia
Paralympic bronze medalists for Colombia
21st-century Colombian people